The Hanson Formation (also known as the Shafer Peak Formation) is a geologic formation on Mount Kirkpatrick and north Victoria Land, Antarctica. It is one of the two major dinosaur-bearing rock groups found on Antarctica to date; the other is the Snow Hill Island Formation and related formations from the Late Cretaceous of the Antarctic Peninsula. The formation has yielded some Mesozoic specimens, but most of it is as yet unexcavated. Part of the Victoria Group of the Transantarctic Mountains, it lies below the Prebble Formation and above the Falla Formation. The formation includes material from volcanic activity linked to the Karoo-Ferar eruptions of the Lower Jurassic. The climate of the zone was similar to that of modern southern Chile, humid, with a temperature interval of 17–18 degrees.
The Hanson Formation is correlated with the Section Peak Formation of the Eisenhower Range and Deep Freeze Range, as well as volcanic deposits on the Convoy Range and Ricker Hills of southern Victoria Land.

History
 
The Victoria Group (also called Beacon Supergroup) from the Central Transantarctic Mountains was defined by Ferrar in 1907, when he described the "Beacon Sandstone" of the sedimentary rocks in the valleys of the Victoria Land. Following this initial work, the term "Beacon System" was introduced for a series of similar sandstones and associated deposits that were recovered locally. Later the "Beacon Sandstone Group" was assigned to those units in Victoria Land, with Harrington in 1965 proposing the name for different units that appear in the Beacon rocks of south Victoria Land, the beds below the Maya erosion surface, the Taylor Group and the Gondwana sequence, including the Victoria Group. This work left out several older units, such as the Permian coal measures and glacial deposits. It was not until 1963 that there was an establishment of the Gondwana sequence: the term Falla Formation was chosen to delimit a 2300 ft (700 m) series of lower quartz sandstone, a middle mica-carbon sandstone and an upper sandstone-shale unit.  The formation lying above the Falla Formation and below the Prebble Formation was then termed the Upper Falla Formation, with considerable uncertainty about its age (it was calculated from the presence of Glossopteris-bearing beds (Early Permian) and the assumed possibility that the rocks were older than Dicroidium-bearing beds, thought to be Late Triassic, in the Dominion Range). Later works tried to set it between the Late Triassic (Carnian) and the Lower-Middle Jurassic (Toarcian–Aalenian). 
The local Jurassic sandstones were included in the Victoria Group, with the Beacon unit defined as a supergroup in 1972, comprising beds overlying the pre-Devonian Kukri erosion surface to the Prebble Formation in the central Transantarctic Mountains and the Mawson Formation (and its unit, then separated, the Carapace Sandstone) in southern Victoria Land. The Mawson Formation, identified at the beginning as indeterminate tillite, was later placed in the Ferrar Group.

Extensive fieldwork later demonstrated the need for revisions to the post-Permian stratigraphy. It was found that only 282 m of the upper 500 m of the Falla Formation as delimited in 1963 correspond to the sandstone/shale sequence, with the other 200 m comprising a volcaniclastic sequence. New units were then described from this location: the Fremouw Formation and Prebble Formation, the latter term being introduced for a laharic unit, not seen in 1963, that occurs between the Falla Formation and the Kirkpatrick Basalt. A complete record was recovered at Mount Falla, revealing the sequence of events in the Transantarctic Mountains spanning the interval between the Upper Triassic Dicroidium-bearing beds and the Middle Jurassic tholeiitic lavas. The upper part of the Falla Formation contains recognizable primary pyroclastic deposits, exemplified by resistant, laterally continuous silicic tuff beds, that led this to be considered a different formation, especially as it shows erosion associated with tectonic activity that preceded or accompanied the silicic volcanism and marked the onset of the development of a volcano-tectonic rift system.

The Shafer Peak Formation was named from genetically identical deposits from north Victoria Land (exposed on Mt. Carson) in 2007 and correlated with the Hanson Formation, defined as tuffaceous deposits with silicic glass shards along with quartz and feldspar. Later works, however, have equated it to a continuation of the Hanson Formation.

The name "Hanson Formation" was proposed for the volcaniclastic sequence that was described in Barrett's 1969 Falla Formation essay. The name was taken from the Hanson Spur, which lies immediately to the west of Mount Falla and is developed on the resistant tuff unit described below.

Paleoenvironment

The Hanson Formation accumulated in a rift environment located between c. 60 and 70S, fringing the East Antarctic Craton behind the active Panthalassan margin of southern Gondwana, being dominated by two types of facies: coarse- to medium-grained sandstone and tuffaceous rocks & minerals on the fluvial strata, which suggest the deposits where influenced by a large period of silicic volcanism, maybe more than 10 million years based on the thickness. When looking at the composition of this tuffs, fine grain sizes, along others aspects such as bubble-wall and tricuspate shard form or crystal-poor nature trends to suggest this volcanic events developed as distal Plinian Eruptions (extremely explosive eruptions), with some concrete layers with mineral grains of bigger size showing that some sectors where more proximal to volcanic sources. The distribution of some tuffs with accretionary lapilli, found scattered geographically and stratigraphically suggest transport by ephemeral river streams, as seen in the Oruanui Formation of New Zealand. The sandstones where likely derived of low-sinuosity sandybraided stream deposits, having interbeds with multistory cross-bedded sandstone bodies, indicators of either side channels or crude splay deposits and concrete well-stratified sections representing overbank deposits and/or ash recycled by ephemeral streams or aeolian processes. Towards the upper layers of the formation the influence of the Tuff in the sandstones get more notorious, evidenced by bigger proportions of volcanic minerals and ash-related materials embedded in between this layers. Overall, the unit deposition bear similarities to the several-hundredmetres-thick High Plains Cenozoic sequence of eastern Wyoming, Nebraska and South Dakota, with the fine-grained ash derived from distal volcanoes.

The Shafer Peak section flora is the typical reported in warm climates. Compared with the underlying Triassic layers, warm and overall humid, possibly more strongly seasonal, specially notorious by the abundance of Cheirolepidiaceae pollen, a key thermophilic element. Yet the dominance of this pollen doesn't indicate proper dry conditions, as for example mudcrack and other indicators of strong dry seasons are mostly absent, while common presence of the invertebrate ichnogenus Planolites indicates the local fluvial, alluvial or lacustrine waters where likely continuous all year, as well the presence of abundant Otozamites trends to suggest high humidity. Overall points to frost-free setting with strong seasonality in day-length given the high latitude, perhaps similar to warm-temperate, frost-free forest and open woodland as in North Island of New Zealand. Despite the proper conditions, peat accumulation was rare, mostly due to the influence of local volcanism, with common wildfire activity as show charred coalified plant remains. At Mount Carson associations of sphenophyte rhizomes and aerial stems, as well isoetalean leaves suggest the presence of overbank deposits that were developed in ephemeral pools that lasted enough to be colonized by semiaquatic plants.

Tectonically, based on the changes seen in the sandstone composition and the appearance of volcanic strata indicates the end of the so-called foreland depositional section in the Transantarctic Mountains, while appearance of arkoses with angular detritus and common Garnet points to local Palaeozoic basement uplift. The Rift Valley deposition is recovered in several coeval and underlying points, with its thickness as indicator of palaeotopographical confinement of palaeoflows coming generally to the NW quadrant, creating a setting that received both sediment derived from the surrounding rift shoulders and ash from distal eruptions. The Main fault indicator of this rift has been allocated around the Marsh Glacier, with the so-called Marsh Fault that breaks apart Precambrian rocks and the Miller Range, with other faults including a W-facing monocline that lies parallel and east of the Marsh Fault, a NW–SE-striking small graben in the southern Marshall Mountains, the fault at the Moore Mountains, the undescribed monocline facing east in the Dominion Range and an uplifted isolated fault in the west of Coalsack Bluff. Marsh Fault was likely active during the early Jurassic, leading to a development of an extensive rift valley system several thousand kilometres long along which basaltic magmatism was focused later towards the Pliensbachian, when the Hanson Formation deposited, somehow similar to East African Rift Valleys and specially Waimangu Volcanic Rift Valley, with segmentation in the rift and possible latter reverse faulting.

.

Fungi

Paleofauna 
The first dinosaur to be discovered from the Hanson Formation was the predator Cryolophosaurus, in 1991; it was formally described in 1994. Alongside these dinosaur remains were fossilized trees, suggesting that plant matter had once grown on Antarctica's surface before it drifted southward. Other finds from the formation include tritylodonts, herbivorous mammal-like reptiles and crow-sized pterosaurs. Surprising was the discovery of prosauropod remains, which were found commonly on other continents only until the Early Jurassic. However, the bone fragments found in the Hanson Formation were dated to the Middle Jurassic, millions of years later. In 2004, paleontologists discovered partial remains of a large sauropod dinosaur that has not yet been formally described.

Synapsida

Pterosauria

Ornithischia

Sauropodomorpha

Theropoda

Arthropoda
At southwest Gair Mesa the basal layers represent a lake shore and are characterised by the noteworthy preservation of some arthropod remains.

Flora 
Fossilized wood is also present in the Hanson Formation, near the stratigraphic level of the tritylodont locality. It has affinities with the Araucariaceae and similar kinds of conifers. In the north Victoria Land region, plant remains occur at the base of the lacustrine beds directly underlying the initial pillow lavas at the top of the sedimentary profile. Some of the layers of Shafer Peak include remains of an in situ stand gymnosperm trees: 
At Mount Carson, at least four large tree trunks were found on an exposed bedding plane. The wood is coalified and only partially silicified, with the largest stem reaching a diameter of nearly 50 cm.
In Suture Bench, silicified tree trunks are found buried in situ along lava flows. Some specimens have several holes or tunnels less than 1 cm wide that may represent arthropod borings.

Palynology
Likely that (at least parts of) the palynomorph contents of these samples may derive from accessory clasts of underlying host strata that were incorporated and reworked during hydrovolcanic activity

Macroflora

See also 

 List of dinosaur-bearing rock formations
 List of fossiliferous stratigraphic units in Antarctica

References 

Geologic formations of Antarctica
Jurassic System of Antarctica
Hettangian Stage
Pliensbachian Stage
Sinemurian Stage
Sandstone formations
Tuff formations
Fluvial deposits
Paleontology in Antarctica
Landforms of the Ross Dependency